Acacia ophiolithica is a shrub of the genus Acacia and the subgenus Plurinerves where it is endemic to a small area along the south west coast of Australia.

Description
Like most species of Acacia it has phyllodes rather than true leaves, The slender, straight, glabrous and evergreen phyllodes are ascending to erect but are quite congested. It blooms from August to October and produces yellow flowers.

Taxonomy
The species was first formally described by the botanists Richard Sumner Cowan and Bruce Maslin in 1995 as a part of the work Acacia Miscellany. Five groups of microneurous species of Acacia (Leguminosae: Mimosoideae: section Plurinerves), mostly from Western Australia as published in the journal Nuytsia. It was reclassified as Racosperma ophiolithicum by Leslie Pedley in 2003 then transferred back to genus Acacia in 2014.
The species belong to the Acacia fragilis group but is most closely related to Acacia uncinella with which it is often confused with.

Distribution
It is native to an area along the south coast of the Goldfields-Esperance region of Western Australia where it is commonly situated along river banks and in rocky areas growing in loamy or clay-loam soils. The plant has a limited range but is common in the area it is found around the Jerdacuttup River to the east of the town of Ravensthorpe where it is commonly a part of mallee Eucalyptus communities but also forms dense stands.

See also
 List of Acacia species

References

ophiolithica
Acacias of Western Australia
Taxa named by Bruce Maslin
Plants described in 1995
Taxa named by Richard Sumner Cowan